Retrospective (also known as Retrospective 1968-1972) is the second greatest hits compilation by Australian singer songwriter Russell Morris. The album was released in 1978. The album contains tracks from his Columbia Records, His Master's Voice and EMI Music years. The track listing is similar to his 1973 compilation, Wings of an Eagle and Other Great Hits.

The album was later released on Compact Disc and music download.

Track listing

References

1978 greatest hits albums
Russell Morris albums
Compilation albums by Australian artists
EMI Records compilation albums
Albums produced by Peter Dawkins (musician)